Stessa spiaggia, stesso mare is an album by Italian singer Mina, issued in 1963.

Some of the songs of this album have been recorded in different languages by Mina during the 1960s. "Stessa spiaggia, stesso mare" has been covered in French ("Tout s'arrange quand on s'aime") and in Spanish ("La misma playa"). "Mi guardano" has two different versions: in Spanish ("Me miran") and a second Italian version (for the 1970 album Quando tu mi spiavi in cima a un batticuore). The track "Non piangerò" was recorded in three other languages: in English ("Just Let Me Cry"), in Spanish ("Déjame llorar") and in French ("Pleurer pour toi"). Mina sang the original German version of "Sì, lo so" ("Heißer Sand"), and also the Spanish ("Un desierto") and the French one ("Notre étoile"). In 2005, she covered again Jobim's "Dindi" in English (for L'allieva). Finally, she recorded the original version of "A volte", "Pretend That I'm Her". All these songs have been published, during the 1990s, in different unofficial compilations (Notre etoile, Mina latina due, Mina canta in spagnolo, Internazionale, Mina canta in inglese).

Track listing

1963 albums
Mina (Italian singer) albums
Italian-language albums